The UEFA Women's Euro 2013 qualifying – Group 5 was contested by five teams competing for one spot for the final tournament.

Standings

Fixtures
All times are UTC+2.

Goalscorers
7 goals
 Daryna Apanaschenko

6 goals
 Sanna Talonen

5 goals
 Linda Sällström

4 goals
 Vera Djatel

3 goals
 Maija Saari
 Veronika Klechová

2 goals

 Olga Aniskovtseva
 Ekaterina Avkhimovich
 Maria Buzunova
 Tatyana Shramok
 Signy Aarna
 Leena Puranen
 Annica Sjölund
 Dominika Škorvánková
 Olena Khodyreva
 Lyudmyla Pekur

1 goal

 Olga Novikova
 Oksana Shpak
 Liis Emajõe
 Katrin Loo
 Kethy Õunpuu
 Emmi Alanen
 Annika Kukkonen
 Marianna Tolvanen
 Diana Bartovičová
 Ivana Bojdová
 Patrícia Hmírová
 Tetyana Chorna
 Tetyana Romanenko
 Daryna Vorontsova

1 own goal
 Eva Kolenová (playing against Finland)

References
Group 5

5
2011–12 in Ukrainian football
2012–13 in Ukrainian football
2011 in Finnish football
2012 in Finnish football
2011 in Belarusian football
2012 in Belarusian football
2011 in Estonian football
2012 in Estonian football
2011–12 in Slovak football
2012–13 in Slovak football